Ko Po Tsuen or Ko Po Village is a village in Kwan Tei, Fanling, North District, Hong Kong.

Administration
Ko Po is a recognized village under the New Territories Small House Policy. Ko Po Tsuen is one of the villages represented within the Fanling District Rural Committee. For electoral purposes, Ko Po Tsuen is part of the Queen's Hill constituency, which is currently represented by Law Ting-tak.

References

External links

 Antiquities Advisory Board. Historic Building Appraisal. Village House, Nos. 1 & 2 Ko Po Tsuen Pictures
 Antiquities Advisory Board. Historic Building Appraisal. Village House, No. 3 Ko Po Tsuen Pictures
 Antiquities Advisory Board. Historic Building Appraisal. Entrance Hall of Nos. 4-7 Ko Po Tsuen Pictures

Villages in North District, Hong Kong
Kwan Tei